McKinney Branch is a stream in Polk County in the U.S. state of Missouri. It is a tributary of the Pomme de Terre River.

McKinney Branch has the name of the local McKinney family.

See also
List of rivers of Missouri

References

Rivers of Polk County, Missouri
Rivers of Missouri